The men's 60 metres hurdles event at the 2021 European Athletics Indoor Championships was held on 6 March 2021 at 13:05 (heats) and on 7 March 2021 13:05 (semi-finals), at 17:00 (final) local time.

Medalists

Records

Results

Heats
Qualification: First 4 in each heat (Q) and the next fastest 4 (q) advance to the Semifinals.

Semifinals
Qualification: First 2 in each heat (Q) and the next 2 fastest (q) advance to the Final.

Final

References

2021 European Athletics Indoor Championships
60 metres hurdles at the European Athletics Indoor Championships